Suburgatory is an American television sitcom that aired from September 28, 2011 to May 14, 2014, on ABC. The series follows a single father who decides to get away from New York City to the suburbs so he can give his teenage daughter a better life. However, the move to suburbs has the daughter wondering if they just entered the world of The Stepford Wives after they see how "perfect" their new locale is, right down to the neighbors who welcome them into the cul-de-sac.

Series overview
{| class="wikitable plainrowheaders" style="text-align:center;"
|-
! colspan="2" rowspan="2" |Season
! rowspan="2" |Episodes
! colspan="2" |Originally aired
|-
! First aired
! Last aired
 |-
 |style="background: #1158A9;"|
 |1
 |22
 | 
 | 
 |-
 |style="background: #FF579D;"|
 |2
 | 22
 | 
 | 
 |-
 |style="background: #03C03C;"|
 |3
 | 13
 | 
 | 
|}

Episodes

Season 1 (2011–12)

Season 2 (2012–13)

Season 3 (2014)
On May 10, 2013, ABC renewed Suburgatory for a thirteen-episode third season, which premiered on January 15, 2014. Former regular cast member Rex Lee did not appear in season three, while Alan Tudyk was demoted to recurring status.

References

External links
 
 

Lists of American sitcom episodes